Corydoras microcephalus is a species of callichthyid armored catfish native to Argentina.

References
 

Corydoras
Fish described in 1912